Dalbergia oligophylla is a species of legume in the family Fabaceae. It is native to Cameroon, and naturalized in certain parts of the Caroline Islands. Its natural habitat is subtropical or tropical moist montane forests. It is threatened by habitat loss.

References

Sources
 Flora of Micronesia.   downloaded on 26 August 2012.

oligophylla
Flora of Cameroon
Endangered plants
Taxonomy articles created by Polbot
Taxa named by John Gilbert Baker
Taxa named by John Hutchinson (botanist)